Fallen Idol(s) may refer to:

Television episodes
 "Fallen Idol" (The Colbys)
 "Fallen Idol" (Dad's Army)
 "Fallen Idol" (M*A*S*H)
 "Fallen Idols" (CSI)
 "Fallen Idols" (Supernatural)

Other
 A Fallen Idol, a 1919 American drama film starring Evelyn Nesbit
 The Fallen Idol (film), a 1948 British crime drama directed by Carol Reed
 Fallen Idols (album) or the title song, by Lord, 2019
 Fallen Idols: Twelve Statues That Made History, a 2021 book by Alex von Tunzelmann